The Raid on Makin Island (17–18 August 1942) was an attack by the United States Marine Corps Raiders on Japanese military forces on Makin Island (now known as Butaritari) in the Pacific Ocean. The aim was to destroy Imperial Japanese installations, take prisoners, gain intelligence on the Gilbert Islands area, and divert Japanese attention and reinforcements from the Allied landings on Guadalcanal and Tulagi. Only the first of these objectives were achieved, but the raid did boost morale and provide a test for Raider tactics.

Preparations and organization
The raid was among the earliest American offensive ground combat operations of World War II. The force was drawn from the 2nd Raider Battalion and comprised a small battalion command group and two of the battalion's six rifle companies. Because of space limitations aboard ship, each company embarked without one of its rifle sections. Battalion headquarters, A Company and 18 men from B Company—totalling 121 troops—were embarked aboard the submarine  and the remainder of B Company—totalling 90 men—aboard . The raiding force was designated Task Group 7.15 (TG 7.15).

The Imperial Japanese Navy created the Makin Atoll Garrison in 1942. It was part of the Marshall Islands Garrison, and officially titled the 62nd Garrison Force. At the time of the Makin raid the total force opposing the American landing consisted of 71 armed personnel of the Japanese seaplane base led by Warrant Officer (Heisouchou) Kyuzaburo Kanemitsu of the Special Naval Landing Force equipped with light weapons. In addition there were also four members of the seaplane tender base and three members of a meteorological unit. Two civilian personnel were attached to the Japanese forces as interpreters and civilian administrators.

Execution of raid

The Marine Raiders were launched in "Landing Craft Rubber Large" (LCRL) inflatable boats powered by small,  outboard motors shortly after 00:00 (midnight) on 17 August. At 05:13, Companies A and B of the 2nd Raider Battalion, commanded by Lt. Col. Evans Carlson, successfully landed on Makin. The landing had been very difficult because of rough seas, high surf, and the failure of many of the outboard motors. Lt. Col. Carlson decided to land all his men on one beach, rather than two beaches as originally planned. At 05:15, Lt. Oscar Peatross and a 12-man squad landed on Makin. In the confusion of the landing, they did not get word of Carlson's decision to change plans and to land all the Raiders on one beach. Thus, Peatross and his men landed where they originally planned. It turned out to be a fortunate error. Undaunted by the lack of support, Peatross led his men inland.

At 07:00, with Company A leading, the Raiders advanced from the beach across the island to its north shore before attacking southwestward. Strong resistance from Japanese snipers and machine guns stalled the advance and inflicted casualties. The Japanese then launched two banzai charges, which were wiped out by the Raiders, thus killing most of the Japanese on the island. At 09:00, Lt. Peatross and his 12 men found themselves behind the Japanese, who were fighting the rest of the Raiders to the east. Peatross's unit killed eight Japanese and the garrison commander Sgt. Major Kanemitsu, knocked out a machine gun and destroyed the enemy radios but suffered three dead and two wounded. Failing to contact Carlson, they withdrew to the subs at dusk, as planned.

At 13:30, 12 Japanese planes, including two flying boats, arrived over Makin. The flying boats, carrying reinforcements for the Japanese garrison, attempted to land in the lagoon but were met with machine gun, rifle and Boys anti-tank rifle fire from the Raiders. One plane crashed, and the other burst into flames. The remaining planes bombed and strafed but inflicted no American casualties.

Evacuation of Raiders
At 19:30, the Raiders began to withdraw from the island using 18 rubber boats, many of which no longer had working outboard motors. Despite heavy surf, seven boats with 93 men made it to the subs. The next morning several boatloads of Raiders were able to fight the surf and reach the sub, but 72 men, along with just three rubber boats, were still on the island. At 23:30, the attempt by most of the Raiders to reach the submarines failed. Despite significant effort, 11 of 18 boats were unable to breach the unexpectedly strong surf. Having lost most of their weapons and equipment, the exhausted survivors struggled back to the beach to link up with 20 fully armed men, who had been left on the island to cover their withdrawal. An exhausted and dispirited Carlson dispatched a note to the Japanese commander that offered to surrender, but the Japanese messenger was killed by other Marines, who were unaware of Carlson's plan.

At 09:00 on 18 August, the subs sent a rescue boat to stretch rope from the ships to the shore that would allow the remaining Raiders' boats to be pulled out to sea. However, just as the operation began, Japanese planes arrived and attacked, sinking the rescue boat and attacking the subs, which were forced to crash-dive and wait on the bottom the rest of the day. The subs were undamaged. At 23:08, having managed to signal the subs to meet his Raiders at the entrance to Makin Lagoon, Carlson had a team led by Lt. Charlie Lamb build a raft made up of three rubber boats and two native canoes powered by the two remaining outboard motors. Using that raft, 72 exhausted Raiders sailed  from Makin to the mouth of the lagoon, where the subs picked them up.

Casualties

USMC casualties were given as 18 killed in action and 12 missing in action. Of the 12 Marines missing in action, one was later identified among the 19 Marine Corps graves found on Makin Island. Of the remaining eleven Marines missing in action, nine were inadvertently left behind or returned to the island during the night withdrawal. They were subsequently captured, moved to Kwajalein Atoll, and executed by Japanese forces. Kōsō Abe was subsequently tried and executed by the Allies for the murder of the nine Marines. The remaining two Marines missing in action were not accounted for.

Carlson reported that he had personally counted 83 Japanese bodies and estimated that 160 Japanese were killed based on reports from the Makin Island natives with whom he spoke. Additional Japanese personnel may have been killed in the destruction of two boats and two aircraft. Morison states that 60 Japanese were killed in the sinking of one of the boats. Japanese records are however more precise and the entire garrison casualties were 46 killed of all ranks (not including the purported large casualties Carlson reported for the boats he had sunk). This was confirmed when supporting Japanese forces returned to the island and found 27 Japanese survivors of the raid.

Conclusions

Although the Marine Raiders succeeded in killing over half of the Imperial Japanese garrison on the island, the raid failed to meet its other material objectives. No Japanese prisoners were taken, and no meaningful intelligence was collected. Also, no significant Japanese forces were diverted from the Solomon Islands area. In fact, because the vulnerabilities to their garrisons in the Gilbert Islands were highlighted by the raid, the Japanese strengthened their fortifications and defensive preparations on the islands in the central Pacific. As a result, the objective to dissipate Japanese forces may have had the unintended consequence of causing heavier losses for American forces during the battles of the Gilbert and Marshall Islands campaigns. However, the raid did succeed in its objectives of boosting morale and testing Raider tactics.

Bioarchaeological recovery
In 2000, 58 years after the raid, the remains of 19 Marines were found on Makin Island through bioarchaeological excavation and recovery, then sent to the Defense Department's Central Identification Laboratory in Hawaii, where they were identified. Six of these Marines were returned to their families for private burial ceremonies. The remaining 13 were buried with full honors at Arlington National Cemetery after a funeral service at Fort Myer Chapel at which the Marine Commandant General James L. Jones spoke. The remaining eleven Marines have not yet been located.

References in popular culture
The raid on Makin is featured in Call of Duty: World at War, in the first single player level ‘Semper Fi’, and as a campaign location in the game Medal of Honor: Pacific Assault.

W.E.B. Griffin's novel Call To Arms, Book Two of The Corps series, focuses on the forming of the Marine Raiders and the raid on Makin Island, as told through the novel's protagonist, Lt. Kenneth 'Killer' McCoy.

The 1943 American propaganda film Gung Ho! was loosely based on the raid, and Evans Carlson was employed as a technical advisor during production.

See also
 Dallas H. Cook
 Clyde A. Thomason
 James Roosevelt
 Battle of Makin
 Gung Ho! (1943 film)

Notes

References
 
 
 
 
 
 
  Review of this book: 
 
 Young, Howard. "Carlson's Raiders on Makin, 17–18 August 1942", Marine Corps Gazette 87(8): August 31, 2003.

External links

 From Makin to Bougainville: Marine Raiders in the Pacific War by Major Jon T Hoffman, USMCR, official USMC historical account of raid
 World War II Submarines and Marines Unite, press release by Commander, Submarines Pacific, in 2000 summarizing the raid.
 - Briefly describes the Makin Raid and its impact on future U.S. operations in the Gilbert Islands.
 
 
  – U.S. propaganda film that dramatizes the Makin Raid.
 list of 19 USMC KIA on Makin
 list of 9 USMC Killed on Kwajelein

History of Kiribati
Wars involving Kiribati
Kiribati in World War II
Makin Raid
Military history of Japan during World War II
Makin Raid
Makin Raid
United States Marine Corps in World War II
1942 in the Gilbert and Ellice Islands
World War II raids
August 1942 events
Japan–Kiribati relations
Amphibious operations involving the United States